The third season of MasterChef Canada originally aired on February 14, 2016 and concluded on June 19. Filming began in September 2015 and ended in November 2015. Torontonian Mary Berg won this season to become the first female winner of MasterChef Canada. Following her victory, Berg pursued her passion for food through catering, confections, recipe development and as a cooking expert on CTV's Your Morning, The Social, and The Marilyn Denis Show. Berg also guest starred in episodes of seasons four, five and seven. She has since hosted her own original cooking television shows, Mary's Kitchen Crush (2019-2020) and Mary Makes It Easy (2021–present) for CTV and CTV Life Channel.

Runner-up Jeremy Senaris, who originally finished second and April Lee Baker, who finished in fifth place both returned to MasterChef Canada: Back to Win. April Lee came in 11th place while Jeremy came in 6th place.

Top 14

Elimination table

 (WINNER) This cook won the competition.
 (RUNNER-UP) This cook finished in second place.
 (WIN) The cook won the individual challenge (Mystery Box Challenge, Pressure Test or Elimination Test).
 (WIN) The cook was on the winning team in the Team Challenge and was directly advanced to the next round.
 (HIGH) The cook was one of the top entries in the Mystery Box Challenge, but did not win, or received considerable praise during an Elimination Test.
 (PT) The cook was on the losing team in the Team Challenge or did not win the individual challenge, but won the Pressure Test.
 (IN) The cook was not selected as a top entry or bottom entry in an individual challenge.
 (IN) The cook was not selected as a top entry or bottom entry in a team challenge.
 (IMM) The cook did not have to compete in that round of the competition and was safe from elimination.
 (IMM) The cook was selected by Mystery Box Challenge winner and did not have to compete in the Elimination Test. 
 (PT) The cook was on the losing team in the Team Challenge, competed in the Pressure Test, and advanced.
 (NPT) The cook was on the losing team in the Team Challenge, but was exempted from the Pressure Test
 (RET) The cook was eliminated but come back to compete to return to the competition.
 (LOW) The cook was one of the bottom entries in an individual elimination challenge or pressure test advanced.
 (LOW) The cook was one of the bottom entries in the Team Challenge, and they advanced. 
 (ELIM) The cook was eliminated from MasterChef.

Episodes

References

MasterChef Canada
2016 Canadian television seasons